The Maytag Corporation is an American home and commercial appliance company owned by Whirlpool Corporation since April 2006.

Company history
The Maytag Washing Machine Company was founded in 1893 by businessman Frederick Maytag. In 1925, Maytag Washing Machine Company became Maytag, Inc. Frederick's son Elmer Henry Maytag took over as president of the company from 1926 until his own death in 1940. In the early 1930s, photographer Theodor Horydczak took pictures of the plant and some of its workers. During the Great Depression of the 1930s the company was one of the few to make a profit. In 1938, Maytag provoked strikes by the company's workers because of a 10% pay cut. The company was able to beat the strike because of the intervention of four military companies, including a machine gun company, of the 113th Cavalry Regiment, Iowa National Guard. At his father's death in 1940, Fred Maytag II, grandson of the founder, took over the presidency. During World War II, the company participated in war production by making special components for military equipment. In 1946, production of washing machines was resumed; in 1949, the first automatic washers were produced in a new, dedicated factory. In 1946, Maytag began marketing a separate line of ranges and refrigerators made by other companies under the Maytag name. During the Korean War, the company again produced parts for military equipment, although washing-machine production continued.

During the 1950s, the 'white goods,' or laundry and kitchen appliance industry, grew rapidly. Maytag first entered the commercial laundry field at this time, manufacturing washers and dryers for commercial self-service laundries and commercial operators. In response, other full-line appliance producers began to compete with Maytag in the white-goods consumer market. These included 'full-line' manufacturers such as Whirlpool, General Electric, Westinghouse, and Frigidaire, who built not only washing machines and dryers, but also refrigerators, stoves, and other appliances. Since Maytag was much smaller than the full-line producers, the company decided to limit itself to the manufacture of washers and dryers, alongside marketing ovens and refrigerators built by other companies, as a small, premium-brand manufacturer. The company capitalized on its reputation by renaming its corporate address in Newton, Iowa, "One Dependability Square".

By 1960, Maytag had ceased marketing ovens and refrigerators, but later  started again to expand into kitchen appliances with its own design of portable kitchen dishwasher and a line of food-waste disposers. Upon the death in 1962 of Fred Maytag II, the last family member involved in the company's management, E. G. Higdon was named president of the company, with George M. Umbreit becoming chairman and CEO. By the late 1970s, over 70 percent of U.S. households were equipped with washers and dryers, and with approximately 18,000 employees worldwide, the company was established as a dominant manufacturer of large laundry appliances.  After the company's acquisition of Magic Chef, Inc., in 1986, a move which nearly doubled its size, the company acquired a new corporate name, Maytag Corporation.

In 1988, Maytag acquired Chicago Pacific Corporation, which was formed using the remnants of the bankrupt Chicago, Rock Island & Pacific Railroad. Chicago Pacific Corporation owned Hoover US and Hoover UK as well as Thomasville Brand Furniture. Maytag quickly sold off the Thomasville Furniture brand. Maytag Corporation, led by Chairman Daniel Krumm, next planned to make Maytag a worldwide organization.
The UK part of Hoover was to help Maytag expand into Europe. Hoover UK was not doing well financially and offered customers a round-trip ticket anywhere if they purchased a vacuum. This campaign cost the corporation $50 million to settle. Subsequently, Maytag sold off Hoover UK. This was a huge setback for the amount of cash Maytag had in hand and thus started the downward spiral financially.

In 1991 Maytag built a new plant in Jackson, Tennessee, for the manufacture of newly designed plastic tub dishwashers. The Plastic tub was developed in Newton, Iowa, but in 1996 Engineering was transferred to Jackson because Mr. Len Hadley, then president of Maytag Corporation, wanted the plant to be self-sufficient. This engineering team engineered a Stainless Steel dishwasher, Tall-Tub Plastic and Tall-Tub Stainless steel product. Engineering crescendoed with a Double Drawer dishwasher which today is manufactured in Findlay Ohio at the Whirlpool Plant, the only Maytag legacy product built in the Whirlpool Appliance line-up. The Jackson plant evolved into a streamlined manufacturing facility that could build thousands of dishwashers daily on multiple lines. This plant was the most efficient plant and was a hallmark for other facilities. Whirlpool closed this plant in 2009.

In 1997, Maytag Corporation purchased G.S. Blodgett Corporation, a maker of commercial ovens. At the time of this purchase Maytag was looking at the Turbo Chef line they had been working on up to this point.

Prior to 1997, the Maytag engineering team, at Maytag Laundry Appliances Research and Development, developed the Maytag Neptune line of front-load washers.  
A matching dryer was introduced to accompany the new washer. The company claimed that the new Neptune model saved energy costs over traditional washer/dryer sets. Production of the Neptune line was later switched to Samsung Electronics. 
In 2001, the company acquired the Amana Corporation and its appliance assembly facilities. That same year, Ralph F. Hake became the last chairman and chief executive officer (CEO) of Maytag Corporation, serving in that post until March 2006. Once renowned as the standard for laundry appliances, by 2003 the company faced increasing competition from new appliance brands in the US market, as well as from existing appliance manufacturers who had outsourced production a decade earlier in order to reduce costs.  
While Maytag had begun the process of shifting appliance production to lower-cost assembly plants outside the United States, in 2004 the company was still producing 88 percent of its products in older U.S.-based factories.  
In an apparent move away from traditional company marketing strategy, company management decided on a plan to stimulate consumer purchases of new Maytag appliances before their old ones had worn out.

Costs incurred in Maytag's acquisition and integration of Amana and an increased corporate debt load led to aggressive internal cost-cutting efforts in direct materials, manufacturing, and distribution costs.   
By 2005, Maytag's market share had declined to all-time lows, sales were flat, and customer satisfaction surveys ranked Maytag near the bottom of the appliance field.  The problems with the Neptune line continued; in 2007, 250,000 Neptune washing machines became part of a nationwide safety recall by the Consumer Product Safety Commission due to fire danger.

In 2005, Haier sought to expand its share of foreign markets by acquiring rival white-goods OEMs and by expanding overseas production capacity. With backing from two large U.S. private equity funds, Haier made a bid to acquire U.S. appliance maker Maytag for $1.28 billion. The bid failed and Maytag was bought by Whirlpool for $1.7 billion.

On April 1, 2006,  Whirlpool completed its acquisition of Maytag Corporation. In May 2006, Whirlpool announced plans to close the former Maytag headquarters office in Newton, as well as laundry product manufacturing plants in Newton, Iowa; Herrin, Illinois; and Searcy, Arkansas by 2007. Following the Maytag headquarters closure, all brand administration was transferred to Whirlpool's headquarters in Benton Harbor, Michigan. The Maytag name would now be used on Whirlpool-designed appliances. Most Maytag employees were terminated, but some were offered jobs at Whirlpool. The board of directors of Maytag all received five years' severance pay. Former Maytag chairman and CEO, Ralph F. Hake, received two years' base salary and two years' target bonus under his severance agreement.

On January 1, 2009, Maytag (under the ownership of the Whirlpool Corp.) changed the vested lifetime benefits of the Maytag retirees. There is a lawsuit pending in the Southern District Court of Iowa where Whirlpool has asked for permission to change the UAW bargained benefits. The benefits in question were subsequently changed despite any resolution of the lawsuit.

Chronology

Owned brands 
 Admiral
 Amana
 Caloric
 Dynasty
 Gaffers & Sattler
 Glenwood
 Hardwick
 Holiday
 Inglis
 Jade
 JennAir
 Litton
 Magic Chef
 Menu Master
 Modern Maid
 Norge
 Sunray

Products
In major appliances, Maytag was among the top three companies in the North American market, offering a full line of washing machines, dryers, dishwashers, cooktops, refrigerators, and ranges under the Maytag, JennAir, Amana, and Magic Chef brands. Maytag also used to manufacture the top load laundry for Crosley until Maytag's merger with Whirlpool.

Maytag sold multiple small appliances including a cordless iron under the Maytag brand, a mixer and blender under JennAir, the company also sold the popular Skybox and Rookie home-vending products.

In floor care, Maytag owned the Hoover brand, the market leader in North America and the floor-care brand with the highest consumer recognition and buying preference.

In commercial products, Maytag owned Dixie-Narco, a leader in refrigerated soft drink and specialty vending machines as well as Jade cooking products and Amana commercial cooking products.

Maytag had presence in markets around the world, including sales operations in Mexico, the United Kingdom, Japan, and Australia. The corporation's export sales and marketing, licensing of brands, and international joint ventures was coordinated by Maytag International in Schaumburg, Illinois.

Maytag International

In 1988, DOMICOR was established as Maytag Corporation's international division and in 1992 became Maytag International, Inc. which eventually encompassed all of Maytag's worldwide ventures including Maytag Australia, Maytag Japan, Maytag Commercial (Mexico), and Maytag UK.

Maytag International, was based in Schaumburg, Illinois, handled the sales, licensing and business ventures of corporate appliances and floorcare brands in overseas markets as well as the administrative support for the international sales organization. This network extended to more than 70 countries worldwide.

Maytag International was responsible for export sales and licensing of the corporation's appliances and floor care brands and joint ventures in overseas markets. This network extends to more than 90 countries worldwide. The main office is located in Chicago with major subsidiary offices in Burlington, Ontario (Canada), Monterrey (Mexico), Sydney (Australia), and London (England) and region sales offices in Beirut (Lebanon) and Yokohama (Japan).

Manufacturing plants
As of 2008, Maytag, by this time a division of Whirlpool Corporation, had 14 manufacturing plants throughout the United States and Mexico.  These included:
 laundry manufacturing plants in the U.S.:  in Newton, Iowa; Herrin, Illinois; and Searcy, Arkansas; and in Mexico: Ciudad Juárez, Chihuahua.
 refrigeration manufacturing plants in Amana, Iowa (built by Amana Corporation, which was later acquired by Maytag) and Reynosa, Tamaulipas
 cooking manufacturing plant in Cleveland, Tennessee (former Magic Chef/Hardwick plant)
 dishwashing manufacturing plant in Jackson, Tennessee
 vending manufacturing plant in Williston, South Carolina
 Floor care manufacturing plant in Canton, Ohio
 subassembly manufacturing plant in Reynosa, Tamaulipas

Over the following years, Whirlpool closed Maytag plants in Newton, Iowa; Herrin, Illinois; Searcy, Arkansas; and Jackson, Tennessee. The Hoover floor care plant in Canton, Ohio was sold to Techtronic Industries, and its Dixie-Narco vending machine plant in Williston, South Carolina was acquired by Crane Merchandising Systems. (Techtronic and Crane acquired the plants when they acquired the Hoover and Dixie-Narco brands, respectively).

The remaining Maytag plants in operation today are in Cleveland, Tennessee and Amana, Iowa.*
Whirlpool has since created a new plant in Cleveland. While holding on to a Maytag legacy workforce, the legacy buildings are no longer in use.

Ol' Lonely

Ol' Lonely, or "the lonely repairman", is a character in Maytag advertisements, created for Maytag by copywriter Vincent R. Vassolo of the Leo Burnett advertising agency. His character was initially played by Jesse White, who retained the role until 1988.  In a time in which the laundry appliances of major manufacturers had reached maturity, differing mostly in minor details, the campaign was designed to remind consumers of the perceived added value in Maytag products derived from the brand's reputation for dependability.  Maytag advertisements stated “Ol' Lonely’s predicament is testimony to the durability and reliability of Maytag appliances. Now if only he had something to do with his days.”  The campaign proved a huge success, allowing Maytag to set a substantial price premium, as well as strongly influencing consumer preference at the higher end of the laundry appliance market.

In 1986, the repairman was joined by Newton, a basset hound named for Maytag’s headquarters in Newton, Iowa. In 1989, character actor Gordon Jump first appeared as Ol' Lonely in the advertisement "Biker". In total, Jump appeared in more than 77 Maytag commercials and print advertisements. He made appearances at events for employees and customers and also was actively involved in several philanthropic and charitable causes.

Actor Hardy Rawls was hired to play Ol' Lonely after Jump's retirement in 2003, although he appeared only in print advertising and personal appearances. Gordon Jump died two months later on September 22, 2003.  In French-speaking Quebec, Ol' Lonely was played by Paul Berval.  For a period of time Maytag gave Ol' Lonely a younger sidekick character known as the "Maytag Apprentice", played by actor Mark Devine. However, in 2005 Maytag cancelled his contract. Maytag also elected not to renew Rawls' contract, instead holding open auditions. Indianapolis Colts backup quarterback Jim Sorgi was among those who auditioned.  On April 2, 2007, Maytag announced that Clay Earl Jackson of Richmond, Virginia had been selected to fill the role of Ol' Lonely.

By the end of the twentieth century, the "Maytag repairman" character had become an iconic metaphor for a professional whose services are rarely needed.  Times were changing however, and events at Maytag and within the industry began to diminish the effectiveness of the long-lived Maytag-repairman campaign.  Consumer demand for innovative, expensive, and increasingly complex electronically controlled and computerized appliances, coupled with higher labor costs and complaints over Maytag product quality and service, influenced a decline in Maytag sales and profit margins.  By 2004, the Maytag repairman character had become to some consumers a symbol of misplaced trust in aging marketing campaigns.  As one commentator noted, "Unfortunately things change, and, after some major quality hiccups, now it's the Maytag salesman who is bemoaning his loneliness. Maytag's reputation has plunged to the bottom with costly consumer class action lawsuits and numerous quality complaints."  As a partial result of Maytag's quality problems, the company reported a loss of $9 million in 2004, according to Industry Week.

In January 2014, Maytag announced a "Generation Five" of the Maytag Repairman, currently played by Colin Ferguson.  But instead of commercials showing the repairman waiting around his shop for a Maytag appliance to break, he is playing the part of the actual appliance.

See also

 Maytag Toy Racer automobiles

References

External links 

 Maytag
 Maytag Corporation website (Archive)
 DLS Maytag Australia
 Maytag.Moscow

 

 
Home appliance brands
Home appliance manufacturers of the United States
Manufacturing companies based in Iowa
Electronics companies established in 1893
1893 establishments in Iowa
Newton, Iowa
Maytag family
American brands
Whirlpool Corporation brands
2006 mergers and acquisitions